The 2019 Dutch Basketball Supercup was the 8th edition of the Dutch Basketball Supercup. The game was played in the Landstede Sportcentrum in Zwolle for the first time.

The game featured Landstede Hammers, the first-time defending champions of the 2018–19 Dutch Basketball League, and ZZ Leiden, the winners of the 2018–19 NBB Cup.

Hammers won the game and secured its second Supercup title.

Background
It was the re-match of the 2018–19 NBB Cup final, which was also played in the Landstede Sportcentrum and was won by Leiden, 69–87. Landstede Hammers came off its first national title in club history and saw most of its players returning. The team strengthened itself with two new Americans, Jordan Johnson and Martez Walker. Mohamed Kherrazi was acquired from Leiden. Kherrazi played his first game against his former team. Leiden entered the Supercup as national cup winners and added five new foreign players in the offseason.

Match details
Landstede led comfortably for most of the game after a 23–15 start. After a halftime score of 48–31, Leiden managed to cut the deficit but never came close to a win. Johnson set an all-time record for most points in a Supercup game with 26.

References

Dutch Basketball Supercup
Supercup